Julian Kymani Champagnie (born June 29, 2001) is an American professional basketball player for the San Antonio Spurs of the National Basketball Association (NBA), on a two-way contract with the Austin Spurs of the NBA G League. He played college basketball for the St. John's Red Storm.

Early life and high school career
Champagnie was born in Staten Island, New York and grew up in Brooklyn, New York and attended Bishop Loughlin Memorial High School, where he played alongside his twin brother, Justin. He averaged 15 points as a junior, earning Third Team All-Catholic High School Athletic Association (CHSAA) AA honors. As a senior, Champagnie averaged 17.2 points and was named to the First Team All-CHSAA AA. He committed to playing college basketball for St. John's over offers from Pittsburgh, Washington State, Cincinnati and Seton Hall.

College career
On March 4, 2020, Champagnie recorded a freshman season-high 23 points and six rebounds in a 77–55 loss to Butler. In his next game, three days later, he posted 21 points and 12 rebounds in an 88–86 win over Marquette. As a freshman, Champagnie averaged 9.9 points and 6.5 rebounds per game. He was a two-time Big East Freshman of the Week and an All-Freshman Team selection. On November 30, 2020, Champagnie made his sophomore season debut, recording 29 points and 10 rebounds in a 97–93 win over Boston College. On January 9, 2021, he tallied 33 points and 10 rebounds in a 97–79 loss to seventh-ranked Creighton, the first 30-point double-double by a St. John's player since D'Angelo Harrison in 2015. As a sophomore, Champagnie averaged 19.8 points, 7.4 rebounds, 1.4 steals and one block per game. Following the season, he declared for the 2021 NBA draft while maintaining his college eligibility. However on July 4, 2021, he announced he was withdrawing from the draft and returning to St. John's for his junior year. On January 5, 2022, he scored a career-high 34 points in a 89–84 win over DePaul. As a junior, Champagnie averaged 19.2 points, 6.6 rebounds, two steals and 1.1 blocks per game. He was named to the First Team All-Big East as a junior for the second consecutive season. On April 2, 2022, Champagnie declared for the 2022 NBA draft, forgoing his remaining college eligibility. He ultimately went undrafted.

Professional career

Philadelphia 76ers (2022–2023)
After going undrafted in the 2022 NBA draft, on June 24, 2022, Champagnie signed a two-way contract with the Philadelphia 76ers, splitting time with their NBA G League affiliate, the Delaware Blue Coats. On February 14, 2023, Champagnie was waived.

San Antonio Spurs (2023–present)
On February 16, 2023, the San Antonio Spurs claimed Champagnie off waivers and signed him to a two-way contract.

Career statistics

NBA

|-
| style="text-align:left;"| 
| style="text-align:left;"| Philadelphia
| 2 || 0 || 3.3 || .000 || .000 ||  || .0 || .0 || .5 || .0 || .0
|- class="sortbottom"
| style="text-align:center;" colspan="2"| Career
| 2 || 0 || 3.3 || .000 || .000 ||  || .0 || .0 || .5 || .0 || .0

College

|-
| style="text-align:left;"| 2019–20
| style="text-align:left;"| St. John's
| 32 || 26 || 25.6 || .453 || .312 || .754 || 6.5 || .8 || 1.2 || .8 || 9.9
|-
| style="text-align:left;"| 2020–21
| style="text-align:left;"| St. John's
| 25 || 24 || 32.9 || .433 || .380 || .887 || 7.4 || 1.3 || 1.4 || 1.0 || 19.8
|-
| style="text-align:left;"| 2021–22
| style="text-align:left;"| St. John's
| 31 || 31 || 34.2 || .414 || .337 || .781 || 6.6 || 2.0 || 2.0 || 1.1 || 19.2
|- class="sortbottom"
| style="text-align:center;" colspan="2"| Career
| 88 || 81 || 30.7 || .429 || .348 || .815 || 6.8 || 1.4 || 1.5 || 1.0 || 16.0

Personal life
Champagnie's twin brother, Justin, plays professional basketball for the Sioux Falls Skyforce. His father, Ranford, played soccer for St. John's in the mid-1990s and was a member of the 1996 national championship team.

References

External links
St. John's Red Storm bio

2001 births
Living people
American men's basketball players
American twins
Basketball players from New York City
Delaware Blue Coats players
Philadelphia 76ers players
San Antonio Spurs players
Shooting guards
Small forwards
Sportspeople from Staten Island
St. John's Red Storm men's basketball players
Twin sportspeople
Undrafted National Basketball Association players